Kenge may refer to:

Kenge, Kwango, the capital of Kwango Province in the Democratic Republic of the Congo, 
Kenge, Bas-Congo, a town in Bas-Congo province of the Democratic Republic of the Congo